Dancesport is a competitive team sport which includes ballroom dancing. The sport became a part of the Asian Games (Asian Summer Games) as a medal sport in 2010 in Guangzhou, People's Republic of China. International governing body of Dancesport, World DanceSport Federation, was recognized by the International Olympic Committee in 1995, and subsequently in 1997 the Asian representative of the sport, Asian DanceSport Federation, was recognized by the Olympic Council of Asia. After the recognition of the Asian DanceSport Federation, the sport was demonstrated at the 1998 Asian Games in Bangkok, Thailand.

Inclusion
World DanceSport Federation, the international governing body of dancesport, was recognized by the International Olympic Committee in September 1995. After two years, the Asian representative of the sport, Asian DanceSport Federation, gained recognition from the Olympic Council of Asia, and dancesport became a part of the Asian Games sports. It was subsequently featured at the 1998 Asian Games in Bangkok, Thailand, as a demonstration sport. Dancesport was included as one of the 42 medal sports in the 2010 Asian Games, held in Guangzhou, People's Republic of China.

Exclusion
Olympic Council of Asia dropped six sports from the Asian Games program: roller sports, chess, cue sports, softball, dancesport and dragon boat. Out of these six, three—roller sports, dancesport and dragon boat—were included only once in the Games, at the Guangzhou 2010. Thus, the dancesport has not been scheduled to be in the program of the 2014 Asian Games, Incheon, South Korea.

Events

Medal table

Participating nations

List of medalists

References

 
Sports at the Asian Games
Asian Games